Nuevo San Carlos is a town, with a population of 22,657 (2018 census), and a municipality in the Retalhuleu department of Guatemala.

References 

Municipalities of the Retalhuleu Department